Hildigunnur Einarsdóttir (born 11 February 1988) is an Icelandic handball player for Bayer 04 Leverkusen and the Icelandic national team.

Referencer 

1988 births
Living people
Hildigunnur Einarsdottir
Hildigunnur Einarsdottir
21st-century Icelandic women